Fredrik Gärdeman (born May 23, 1968) is a retired Swedish football striker.

References

External links
 
  

1968 births
Living people
Swedish footballers
Åtvidabergs FF players
Stabæk Fotball players
Vålerenga Fotball players
Skeid Fotball players
Allsvenskan players
Superettan players
Kalmar FF players
Swedish expatriate footballers
Expatriate footballers in Norway
Swedish expatriate sportspeople in Norway
Association football forwards
Norwegian First Division players
Eliteserien players
Sportspeople from Linköping
Footballers from Östergötland County